Reginald Prince Freeman (born May 8, 1970) is a former American football linebacker. He played the 1993 NFL season with the New Orleans Saints.

After playing college football at Florida State, Freeman was selected in the second round, 53rd overall, of the 1993 NFL Draft by the Saints, which “was a reach to some.”

He was signed by the Green Bay Packers in 1996, but never played for them.

References 

1970 births
Living people
American football linebackers
Florida State Seminoles football players
New Orleans Saints players
People from Clewiston, Florida